Wesley Leggett (born March 16, 2001) is an American soccer player who plays as a forward for the USL Championship club Loudoun United FC.

Career

Youth
Leggett attended Princeton Day School where he was a 3 year starter serving as captain his senior year. He tallied 22 goals and five assists as a senior after posting 20 goals and four assists as a junior.  During his sophomore year Leggett tallied 7 goals and helped lead the PDS Panthers to a Prep B Championship and Prep B Finalist his senior year.  He was named Prep Player of the Year, First Team All-Prep and First Team All-Area.

Leggett played club soccer for Match Fit Academy.  He led his team to the U-17 NJYS State Cup Championship and USYS Region1 Semi Finalist. During his junior year, Match Fit Academy joined the inaugural year of the Boys Elite Clubs National League (ECNL).  As an ECNL standout, Leggett was named a 2x All American, Northeast Conference Player of the year, All Conference Team, and invited to the National Training Camp in the Bahamas, where he scored a goal against the Bahamian national team.

College 
In 2019, Leggett attended the University of Connecticut to play college soccer. In his freshman season, he made six appearances for the Huskies. Following the cancelled 2020 season due the COVID-19 pandemic, Leggett transferred to St. John's University in the spring of 2020. He went on to make 44 appearances for the Red Storm, scoring ten goals and adding six assists.

While at college, Leggett also played in the USL League Two with Real Central New Jersey. Over two seasons, Leggett scored seven goals in 14 regular season appearances.

Professional
In December 2022 Leggett entered the 2023 MLS SuperDraft as one of the 367 eligible players.  On January 10, 2023, Leggett signed with USL Championship club Loudoun United. He made his professional debut March 11th, appearing as an 84th-minute substitute during a 3–1 away victory over Memphis 901.

References

2001 births
Living people
American soccer players
Association football forwards
Loudoun United FC players
People from Lawrence Township, Mercer County, New Jersey
Soccer players from New Jersey
Sportspeople from Mercer County, New Jersey
St. John's Red Storm men's soccer players
UConn Huskies men's soccer players
USL Championship players
USL League Two players